Vashami Allen (born 9 May 1997 in All Saints, Antigua and Barbuda) is an Antiguan footballer who last operated as defender for Central FC in the TT Pro League. His football ambition is to play in Europe.

Early life

First getting involved in football at his primary school, the Antiguan was identified as a possible talent by coaches there, starting his football career. Growing up, Allen saw Antiguan footballer Dave Carr play frequently for the national team.

Career

Central FC

One of 12 players sent to Central FC on three-week contracts to help the club in its audacious attempt to win three CFU Club Championships in succession, Allen refused to renew his contract with the club after claiming to have been living in poor conditions and not getting a monthly wage.

International

Named on the Antigua and Barbuda Under-20 roster in 2016, the defender helped the team finish second behind Haiti to qualify for the 2017 CONCACAF U-20 Championship, getting a spot in the Caribbean qualifying Best Eleven. Making his second senior national team cap against Estonia, Allen nervousness ahead of the game was alleviated by encouragement from the senior players and put up a solid performance.

References

Expatriate footballers in Trinidad and Tobago
Antigua and Barbuda expatriate footballers
Antigua and Barbuda expatriate sportspeople in Trinidad and Tobago
Antigua and Barbuda footballers
Antigua and Barbuda international footballers
Association football defenders
1997 births
Living people
Central F.C. players
TT Pro League players
Antigua and Barbuda under-20 international footballers